Prince of Cats is a 2012 graphic novel by Ronald Wimberly. The story focuses on Tybalt, a character from Romeo and Juliet, and is set in 1980s New York. After being out of print for four years, the book was re-worked and re-released in 2016.

Legendary Entertainment won the filming rights to the graphic novel in July 2018, with Lakeith Stanfield set to play the lead role of Tybalt. Spike Lee is attached to direct.

References

2012 graphic novels
American graphic novels
Works based on Romeo and Juliet
Comics based on works by William Shakespeare